Arena of Khazan is a 1979 role-playing game adventure for Tunnels & Trolls published by Flying Buffalo.

Plot summary
Arena of Khazan is a scenario involving brutal combat in the arena of the City of Death.

Reception
Lorin Rivers reviewed Arena of Khazan in The Space Gamer No. 28. Rivers commented that "This adventure can be fun, but not recommended for highly-valued characters."

References
 

Role-playing game supplements introduced in 1979
Tunnels & Trolls adventures